The Ambassador of the United Kingdom to the Philippines is the United Kingdom's foremost diplomatic representative in the Republic of the Philippines, and head of the UK's diplomatic mission there.  The official title is His Britannic Majesty's Ambassador to the Republic of the Philippines.

The British ambassador to the Philippines is also accredited as non-resident ambassador to the Republic of Palau. There is no British embassy or consulate in Palau.

The following is a chronological list of British heads of mission (ministers and ambassadors) in the Philippines from 1844. Before the country's independence in 1946, there were no ambassadors exchanged between the two countries, the highest rank being envoy extraordinary and minister plenipotentiary – a rank just below ambassador as well as consul-generals based in Manila. The rank of ambassador extraordinary and plenipotentiary was later officially elevated in 1954.

List of heads of mission

Consuls and consul generals during the Spanish and American colonial periods

Ministers

Ambassadors

References

Notes

External links
British Embassy Manila

Philippines
 
United Kingdom